Skerne and Wansford is a civil parish in the East Riding of Yorkshire, England.

The civil parish is formed by the villages of Skerne and Wansford.

According to the 2011 UK census, Skerne and Wansford parish had a population of 345, an increase on the 2001 UK census figure of 318.

References

External links

Civil parishes in the East Riding of Yorkshire